Oleh Serhiyovych Chuvayev (born 25 October 1987) is a Ukrainian professional football goalkeeper who is currently a free agent.

Career
He is the product of the Vorskla Poltava Youth School system. He also holds Russian citizenship as Oleg Sergeyevich Chuvayev.

External links 
 
 
 
 Profile on Football Squads

References 

1987 births
People from Kremenchuk
Living people
Ukrainian footballers
Association football goalkeepers
FC Vorskla Poltava players
FC Vorskla-2 Poltava players
FC Kremin Kremenchuk players
MFC Mykolaiv players
FC Sevastopol players
FC Sevastopol-2 players
FC Tom Tomsk players
FC Khimik Dzerzhinsk players
FC Zorya Luhansk players
FC Podillya Khmelnytskyi players
Ukrainian expatriate footballers
Expatriate footballers in Russia
Ukrainian expatriate sportspeople in Russia
Ukrainian Premier League players
Ukrainian First League players
Ukrainian Second League players
Russian First League players
Sportspeople from Poltava Oblast